The Eddy Duchin Story is a 1956 biopic of band leader and pianist Eddy Duchin starring Tyrone Power and Kim Novak. Filmed in CinemaScope, the Technicolor production was directed by George Sidney and written by Samuel A. Taylor. Harry Stradling received an Academy Award nomination for his cinematography. The picture received four nominations in total and was one of the highest-grossing films of 1956. Incorporating signature elements of Duchin's style into his own, Carmen Cavallaro performed the piano music for the film.

Some of the film's box office success can be attributed to the appearance of Novak in ads for No-Cal diet soda. Novak became one of the first celebrities to be featured in advertisements for soft drinks, and each ad also featured a reminder to see Novak in The Eddy Duchin Story.

Musician Peter Duchin, whose relationship with his father is a major subject of the film, has written very negatively about the script, saying there was too much unnecessary fictionalization of his parents' lives and deaths.

Plot
Fresh out of pharmacy school, young Eddy Duchin travels to New York in the 1920s to take a job playing piano for bandleader Leo Reisman's orchestra. But upon arrival, Eddy learns there is no such job.

A wealthy socialite, Marjorie Oelrichs, overhears his playing and takes a personal interest in Eddy. When he is invited to the home of her wealthy aunt and uncle, the Wadsworths, for a party, Eddy is disappointed to discover that he has been asked there merely to entertain.

Having fallen in love, Marjorie goes so far as to propose marriage to Eddy rather than the other way around. She has secret fears that she expresses on their wedding night, and tragedy strikes when Marjorie dies soon after giving birth to their child.

An anguished Eddy abandons his baby boy, Peter, leaving him in the Wadsworths' care.  Five years later, Eddy returns to New York and meets Peter for the first time. Eddy then joins the U. S. Navy and serves on a warship in the war. After the war he is finally persuaded to visit his son, where he meets Peter's governess, a British woman named Chiquita, who grows on him after an uneasy start. Peter is learning to play the piano.

Eddy has an engagement at the Waldorf-Astoria hotel, but his hand freezes while at the keyboard. He eventually is diagnosed with a fatal illness and has no more than a year to live. After he marries Chiquita, he struggles with telling Peter about his illness, but does, after first simply saying that soon he'll be "going away."

Cast
 Tyrone Power as Eddy Duchin
 Kim Novak as Marjorie Oelrichs
 Victoria Shaw as Chiquita Wynn
 James Whitmore as Lou Sherwood
 Larry Keating as Leo Reisman
 Rex Thompson as Peter Duchin (age 12)
 Mickey Maga as Peter Duchin (age 5)

Production
In 1954 Columbia paid $100,000 for the rights for a film biography of Eddy Duchin. The deal included a story by Leo Katcher, The Eddy Duchin Story. Attorney Sol Rosenblatt represented Katcher along with Duchin's son, Peter, and his widow, Maria Duchin, now Mrs Morgan Heap. The rights included approval on story and casting. George Sidney claims Columbia were given the rights to Duchin's life because W. Averell Harriman, who was close to Duchin, liked what that studio had done with films based on the life of Al Jolson. 

Georgie Sidney, the director, said he left MGM to work at Columbia in order to make the film (he had been taught piano by Duchin and seen the pianist's last concert). In November 1954 Columbia announced Sidney would direct, Jerry Wald would produce, and Moss Hart would write the script, the latter under a three-picture deal. Sidney says Hart dropped out when he fell ill so Samuel Taylor wrote it, with Clifford Odets doing some uncredited work.

Filming started 8 August 1955.

Soundtrack recordings
In 1956 and 1957 respectively, two musical "soundtrack" recordings, that is, studio recordings of songs from the film, were issued. Twelve of the film's songs were released in The Sound Track Album, The Eddy Duchin Story, with Carmen Cavallaro at the piano. This recording was issued by Decca in 1956 (mono) as DL 8289 and reissued in stereo in 1965 as Decca DL 78289 (which was also issued in Mexico and Canada). In 1957, Capitol Records issued an LP album entitled,  Selections from The Eddy Duchin Story (Capitol T-716), featuring nine of the original album's twelve soundtracks. Accompanied by the Harry Geller Orchestra, pianists George Greeley and Harry Sukman performed the selections. Somewhat ironically, both pianists imitated (usually quite closely and rather ably) Cavallaro's beloved interpretations of the songs rather than Duchin's. Given the extraordinary commercial success of the original soundtrack, it is no wonder.

Other soundtrack recordings
There was a musical tribute soundtrack, played by Al Lerner, A Tribute to Eddy Duchin. Released by Tops Records in 1957, this release featured the following tunes: 
 "Manhattan"
 "Nocturne in E Flat"
 "Starlight Concerto"
 "Gee, Baby, I Ain't Too Good to You"
 "Shine"
 "Night Dreams"
 "My Heart Belongs to Daddy"
 "It Must Be True"
 "I Can't Give You Anything But Love, Baby"
 "Bésame Mucho"
 "Love Walked In" 
 "Whispering"
(A special detail from the vinyl record of this tribute is that it is not black, but is made of yellow translucent material, with some brown figures in veneer)

Awards
The film was nominated for four Academy Awards.
 Cinematography (Color) - Harry Stradling
 Music (Scoring of a Musical Picture) - Morris Stoloff, George Duning
 Sound Recording - Columbia Studios Sound Department - John P. Livadary
 Writing (Motion Picture Story) - Leo Katcher

See also
List of American films of 1956

References

Further reading

External links
 
 
 
 
 

1956 films
1950s biographical drama films
American biographical drama films
Biographical films about musicians
Columbia Pictures films
Films about pianos and pianists
Films directed by George Sidney
Films scored by George Duning
Films scored by Morris Stoloff
Films with screenplays by Samuel A. Taylor
Cultural depictions of jazz musicians
Cultural depictions of American men
1956 drama films
CinemaScope films
1950s English-language films
1950s American films